The Highland Park Water Tower is a historic water tower on the west side of Green Bay Road in Highland Park, Illinois. The tower is Highland Park's third water tower and serves as a visual and symbolic landmark for the city. Its design features tall brick arches on its eight sides and a classical pediment above its entrance. The tower's water tank is capable of holding .

The tower was added to the National Register of Historic Places on September 29, 1982.

References

National Register of Historic Places in Lake County, Illinois
Water towers in Illinois
Water towers on the National Register of Historic Places in Illinois
Towers completed in 1930
Highland Park, Illinois